The 92nd Punjabis were an infantry regiment of the British Indian Army. The regiment was raised in 1800 as a battalion of Madras Native Infantry. It was designated as the 92nd Punjabis in 1903 and became 4th Battalion (Prince of Wales's Own) 8th Punjab Regiment in 1922. In 1947, it was allocated to Pakistan Army, where it continues to exist as 4th Battalion of The Baloch Regiment.

Early history
The regiment was raised on 1 January 1800 at Madura as the 2nd Battalion 16th Regiment of Madras Native Infantry by Lieutenant Colonel Alexander Dyce and was known as Dyce ki Paltan (Dyce's Battalion). It was composed mostly of Muslims, Tamils and Telugus. In 1801, it took part in suppressing a rebellion of the Poligars (local feudal chieftains) of Madura and Tinnevelly in South India. In 1809, it took part in the Travancore War and in 1824, it participated in the First Anglo-Burmese War. The same year, it was redesignated as the 32nd Regiment of Madras Native Infantry. During the Great Indian Rebellion of 1857, it operated in Central India.

In 1890, the 32nd Madras Infantry was reconstituted with Punjabi Muslims and Sikhs, and permanently based in Burma. Its designation was changed to 4th Regiment of Burma Infantry, and in 1891, to 32nd Regiment (4th Burma Battalion) of Madras Infantry. In 1901, its title was changed to 32nd Burma Infantry. The Burma Battalions were special units raised to police the new territories acquired in the Third Anglo-Burmese War and pacify the rebellious hill tribes inhabiting the frontier regions of Burma. In 1890 and 1894, the regiment operated in the Shan States, where it repulsed an incursion by the French. In 1891, it operated in the Chin Hills against recalcitrant hill tribes.

92nd Punjabis
Subsequent to the reforms brought about in the Indian Army by Lord Kitchener in 1903, all former Madras units had 60 added to their numbers. Consequently, the regiment's designation was changed to 92nd Punjabis. In 1910, Major General ES Hastings, CB, DSO, who had commanded the regiment from 1891 to 1907, was appointed the Colonel of 92nd Punjabis. In 1910, the Burma Battalions were delocalized from Burma and in 1913, the 92nd Punjabis moved to Benares in India.
On the outbreak of the First World War, the 92nd Punjabis sailed for Egypt in November 1914, where they defended the Suez Canal against the Turkish attack in February 1915. Moving to Mesopotamia in December 1915, they were engaged in fierce fighting on the Tigris Front, as the British made desperate efforts to raise the Siege of Kut al Amara, and later, during the British advance northwards. The regiment took part in the Battles of Sheikh Sa'ad, the Wadi, Hanna, the three Battles of Sannaiyat, and the Actions of Shawa Khan, Istabulat, Daur and Tikrit. It fought with great gallantry and suffered grievous losses in the long and bloody campaign. In 1918, the 92nd Punjabis proceeded to Palestine and took part in the Battle of Megiddo, which led to the annihilation of Turkish Army in Palestine.
During the war, the 92nd Punjabis suffered 1591 casualties including 271 killed. For their exceptional bravery and excellent performance in the war, the 92nd Punjabis were made Prince of Wales's Own and on 1 January 1922, Edward, the Prince of Wales was gazetted as their Colonel-in-Chief.

Subsequent History
After the First World War, the	92nd (Prince of Wales's Own) Punjabis were grouped with the 90th Punjabis, 91st Punjabis (Light Infantry), 93rd Burma Infantry and the two battalions of 89th Punjabis to form the 8th Punjab Regiment in 1922. The battalion was redesignated as the 4th Battalion (Prince of Wales's Own) 8th Punjab Regiment. During the Second World War, 4/8th Punjab (PWO) served in Iran and Iraq. In 1947, the 8th Punjab Regiment was allocated to Pakistan Army. In 1956, it was merged with the Baluch Regiment and 4/8th Punjab was redesignated as 4 Baluch (now 4 Baloch). During the Indo-Pakistani War of 1965, the battalion again distinguished itself on the Sialkot Front.

Genealogy

1800 - 2nd Battalion 16th Regiment Madras Native Infantry
1824 - 32nd Regiment Madras Native Infantry
1885 - 32nd Regiment Madras Infantry
1890 - 4th Regiment Burma Infantry
1891 - 32nd Regiment (4th Burma Battalion) Madras Infantry
1901 - 32nd Burma Light Infantry
1903 - 92nd Punjabis
1922 - 92nd Prince of Wales's Own Punjabis
1922 - 4th Battalion (Prince of Wales's Own) 8th Punjab Regiment or 4/8th Punjab
1956 - 4th Battalion The Baluch Regiment or 4 Baluch
1991 - 4th Battalion The Baloch Regiment or 4 Baloch

References

Further reading
 Ahmad, Maj Rifat Nadeem, and Ahmed, Maj Gen Rafiuddin. (2006). Unfaded Glory: The 8th Punjab Regiment 1798-1956. Abbottabad: The Baloch Regimental Centre.
 Ahmad, Lt Col Rifat Nadeem. (2010). Battle Honours of the Baloch Regiment. Abbottabad: The Baloch Regimental Centre.
 
 
 Phythian-Adams, Lt Col EG. (1943). Madras Infantry 1748-1943. Madras: The Government Press.
 Wilson, Lt Col WJ. (1882–88). History of the Madras Army. Madras: The Government Press.

See also
Baloch Regiment
8th Punjab Regiment
Madras Army
Colonel Charles James William Grant, VC (Victoria Cross recipient, 1891) 

Baloch Regiment
British Indian Army infantry regiments
Military units and formations established in 1800
Military units and formations disestablished in 1922
Indian World War I regiments